Attack of the Jurassic Shark (also called Jurassic Shark) is a 2012 Canadian independent action horror-thriller film project directed by Brett Kelly. It parodies two Steven Spielberg-directed films at once: Jaws and Jurassic Park.

Plot
A megalodon (prehistoric shark) is accidentally unleashed after an oil rig in the middle of a small island on a lake drills too far into the lake floor. The resulting malfunction also creates an explosion. The shark eats two girls before attacking a group of art thieves in a boat which consists of Barb, Rich, Doug, Jerry, and Jack. Jack is eaten while the others escape onto the island, although they drop the painting into the water. Jerry is sent in to get it, although fails to do so, and is killed by the shark.

Meanwhile, a group of college students consisting of Jill, Tia, Kristen, and Mike attempt to get onto the island so Jill can find the rig, which she hopes will help with her essay on pollution. However, the shark attacks their boat, and kills Mike while the others reach shore. They meet up with the thieves who claim to be tourists, and spend the night on the island. The next morning, they find the facility, as well as the only survivor of the explosion, Dr. Lincoln Grant. Barb, Rich, and Doug then reveal their true identities, and force Grant into the water to retrieve the painting, although he's quickly eaten. Jill, Tia, and Kristen use this time to hide, although the thieves chase them, and Kristen is eaten in the ensuing chaos while Jill and Tia are recaptured.

The next morning, Barb has Jill and Tia dive for the painting while Rich distracts the shark with dynamite. The girls throw a rock at Rich, which gives the dynamite enough time to explode in his hand, killing him. They then throw a rock at Doug, and he ends up in the water, where he's killed. The girls get hold of a gun, and end up in a stand off, although the shark jumps out of the water, and eats Barb. Jill then uses the remaining dynamite to kill the shark, and she and Tia leave the island. Meanwhile, two fishermen are eaten alive by another megalodon, hinting that the threat is not over.

Cast
 Emanuelle Carriere as Jill
 Christine Emes as Tia
 Celine Filion as Kristen
 Angela Parent as Barb
 Duncan Milloy as Rich
 Phil Dukarsky as Doug
 Kyle Martellacci as Mike
 Joshua Gilbert Crosby as Jack
 Kevin Preece as Jerry
 Jurgen Vollrath as Dr. Lincoln Grant
 George Hudson as Luke
 Kala Gray as Brittany
 Sarah Mosher as Tiffany
 Sherry Thurig as Scientist
 Jody Haucke as Chairman
 Real Darren Stevens as Fisherman 1
 Ian Quick as Fisherman 2
 Kimberly Wolfe as Beer Girl

Reception
Fangoria called it an "Ottawa-shot sharksploitationer" with a mood that "is pure fun, akin to recent marine-life-run-amok fare [such] as Piranha 3D and Sharktopus.  Conversely, Alex DiGiovanna of Move Buzzers panned the film, noting that with VOD or direct to DVD films about giant creatures attacking folks on a beach "you can expect them to be funny, in a terrible sort of way while also having some sort of added entertainment value.  Too bad that’s not the case with Brett Kelly’s wannabe Jaws meets Jurassic Park Megalodon feature, Attack of the Jurassic Shark". He offered "when I say this movie is one of the worst pieces of cinema that my eyes had the misfortune of viewing, I truly mean it."  He explained "I love terrible horror movies, I think they’re hilarious and while this one had a few of those moments, it couldn't live up to its potential." He noted that viewer expectations would be subverted by only "average girls in bikinis, terrible prop work, awful CG (for the most part), pathetic death sequences, a flying shark and a really long, dialogue-free walking montage."

Dread Central spoke negatively about production's first efforts at a film trailer, calling it "underwhelming" as "a trailer for a killer shark movie with very little shark in it". Comparing the early trailer to the later, they expanded by writing "the differences between the two trailers should be a lesson to indie filmmakers not to release the first trailer for their movie to the public before they’re really ready to show off their movie goods."

JoBlo spoke somewhat more positively about the later trailer which included footage of the purported megalodon and predicted the film "has potential to become something special."  After DVD release, they found the film and premise to be "ridiculous shit".

Aint It Cool News panned the film for poor CGI effects making its shark look cartoonish. They expanded it was "Amazing how bad the effects are here," and that the film was "an exercise in how not to make a low budget flick".

References

External links
  Jurassic Shark at the Internet Movie Database
 Jurassic Shark at Weekend Notes

2012 films
2010s adventure films
2012 horror films
2012 horror thriller films
Canadian horror thriller films
Canadian independent films
English-language Canadian films
Canadian adventure thriller films
Adventure horror films
Mockbuster films
2010s English-language films
Fictional sharks
Films about sharks
Giant monster films
Canadian natural horror films
Seafaring films
Films about shark attacks
2012 independent films
2010s Canadian films